The Jurupa Oak, or Hurungna Oak, is a clonal colony of Quercus palmeri (Palmer's oak) trees in the Jurupa Mountains in Crestmore Heights, Riverside County, California. The colony has survived an estimated 13,000 years through clonal reproduction, making it one of the world's oldest living trees. The oak was discovered by botanist Mitch Provance in the 1990s and at the time he recognized it as disjunct for the species and likely an “ancient” clonal stand.

The colony only grows after wildfires, when its burned branches sprout new shoots. It is the only one of its species in the surrounding area, which is a much drier climate and lower altitude than that in which Palmer's oaks typically grow. The oak has roughly 70 clusters of stems in a thicket which measures 25x8 metres in area and one metre in height.

See also
List of Riverside County, California, placename etymologies#Jurupa
List of long-living organisms
List of oldest trees
List of individual trees
King Clone

References

External links
A Pleistocene Clone of Palmer's Oak in Southern California 

Individual oak trees
Flora of California
Flora of Riverside County, California
Landmarks in California
Individual trees in California
Oldest trees